The 2015–16 Saudi Professional League (known as the Abdul Latif Jameel Professional League for sponsorship reasons) was the 40th season of the Saudi Professional League, the top Saudi professional league for association football clubs, since its establishment in 1976. The season began on 19 August 2015 and ended on 14 May 2016. Al-Nassr were the two time defending champions having won their seventh title last season. The league was contested by the 12 teams from the 2014–15 season as well as Al-Qadisiyah and Al-Wehda, who joined as the promoted clubs from the 2014–15 First Division. They replace Al-Orobah and Al-Shoulla who were relegated to the 2015–16 First Division.

On 24 April, Al-Ahli secured their third league title and first since 1984 with two games to spare after defeating second-placed Al-Hilal 3–1 at home.

Hajer were the first team to be relegated following a 1–0 home defeat to Al-Ahli Al-Orobah on 17 April. Najran became the second and final team to be relegated following a 3–3 draw with Al-Raed on the final matchday.

Teams
Fourteen teams competed in the league – the twelve teams from the previous season and the two teams promoted from the First Division. The promoted teams were Al-Qadisiyah (returning to the top flight after three years) and Al-Wehda (returning to the top flight after two years). They replaced Al-Orobah (ending their two-year top-flight spell) and Al-Shoulla (ending their three-year top-flight spell).

Stadiums and locations

Note: Table lists in alphabetical order.

Personnel and kits 

 1 On the back of the strip.
 2 On the right sleeve of the strip.

Managerial changes

Foreign players
The number of foreign players is limited to 4 per team, and should not be a goalkeeper.

Players name in bold indicates the player is registered during the mid-season transfer window.

League table

Positions by round
The following table lists the positions of teams after each week of matches. In order to preserve the chronological evolution, any postponed matches are not included to the round at which they were originally scheduled, but added to the full round they were played immediately afterwards. If a club from the Saudi Professional League wins the King Cup, they will qualify for the AFC Champions League, unless they have already qualified for it through their league position. In this case, an additional AFC Champions League group stage berth will be given to the 3rd placed team, and the AFC Champions League play-off round spot will be given to 4th.

Results

Season progress

Relegation play-offs
Al-Raed who finished 12th faced Al-Batin who finished 3rd in the 2015–16 Saudi First Division for a two-legged play-off. The winner on aggregate score will take part in the 2016–17 Saudi Professional League. Al-Raed won 5–3 on aggregate and secured their place in the next season.

First leg

Second leg

Season statistics

Scoring

Top scorers

Hat-tricks 

Notes
(H) – Home; (A) – Away4 Player scored 4 goals

Most assists

Clean sheets

Discipline

Player 
 Most yellow cards: 9
 Salman Hazazi (Al-Khaleej)
 Adnan Fallatah (Al-Taawoun)
 Most red cards: 2
 Aminou Bouba (Al-Khaleej)
 Mahmoud Muaaz (Al-Taawoun)
 Mamadou Wagué (Najran)

Club 
 Most yellow cards: 61
 Al-Khaleej
 Most red cards: 7
 Najran

Attendances

By round

Source:

By team

†

†

See also
 2015–16 Saudi First Division
 2015–16 Saudi Second Division
 2016 King Cup
 2015–16 Crown Prince Cup
 2015 Super Cup

References

External links
 Saudi Pro League Statistics 2015/2016

Saudi Professional League seasons
Saudi Professional League
1